A  List of people from Marrakesh. See also :Category:People from Marrakesh.

Yusuf ibn Tashfin, prominent Almoravid king and founder of the city
Amine Amamou, footballer
Averroes, 12th-century Muslim philosopher
Abd al-Mu'min, first Almohad caliph
Qadi Ayyad, 12th-century Moroccan Maliki scholar
Ibn al-Banna' al-Marrakushi, 13th-century Moroccan mathematician and astronomer
Ibn Idhari, 13th-century Moroccan historian
Abdelwahid al-Marrakushi, 13th-century Moroccan historian
Ahmad al-Mansur, prominent Saadi dynasty king
Abd el-Ouahed ben Messaoud, 16th-century Moroccan diplomat and ambassador to Elizabeth I of England; possible inspiration for Shakespeare's Othello character
Ahmad ibn Qasim Al-Hajarī, prominent 16th-century Morisco who escaped the Spanish Inquisition and worked as an ambassador for Morocco
Mohamed Abdelaziz, president of the Polisario Front
Juan Goytisolo, Spanish novelist
Yves Saint-Laurent, French designer and artist (1936–2008)
Jean-Paul Gaultier, French fashion designer and grand couturier
Elias Canetti, winner of the Nobel Prize in Literature in 1981 (1905–1994)
Claude Auchinleck, British field marshal (1884–1981)
Josephine Baker, American-French singer and dancer (1906–1975)
 Abdelali Mhamdi, professional goalkeeper.

Marrakesh